Bramfield may refer to:

 Bramfield, Hertfordshire
 Bramfield, Suffolk
Bramfield, South Australia, a locality in the District Council of Elliston